"Va Va Voom" is a song by Trinidadian-American rapper and singer Nicki Minaj from the deluxe version of her second studio album, Pink Friday: Roman Reloaded. It was released on September 12, 2012 by Young Money, Cash Money, and Universal Republic as the fifth single from the album. The song was written by Minaj, Lukasz Gottwald, Allan Grigg, Max Martin, and Henry Walter, and it was produced by Dr. Luke, Kool Kojak, and Cirkut. Being released as the fifth single, it was sent to UK radio stations on September 15, 2012 and later sent to Top 40 mainstream radio on October 23, 2012. It was planned to serve as the lead single, but its release was postponed at the last minute in favor of "Starships". It was  included on the deluxe edition of Pink Friday: Roman Reloaded, and was later included in the album's reissue Pink Friday: Roman Reloaded – The Re-Up. 

"Va Va Voom" is a dance-pop and electropop song with lyrics about sexual activity towards a male. Upon its release, the song received acclaim from critics, with it being catchy and radio-friendly. Commercially, the song entered the top twenty in countries including Ireland, Slovakia, New Zealand and the United Kingdom. An accompanying music video was shot in December 2011, but was initially shelved after Minaj decided not to release "Va Va Voom" as the album's lead single, because she was not happy with the video's end result.

Background
"Va Va Voom" was written by Minaj, Lukasz Gottwald, Allan Grigg, Max Martin and Henry Walter, with production by Dr. Luke, Kool Kojak and Cirkut. It was intended to be the lead single from Pink Friday: Roman Reloaded. It was to be solicited to rhythmic contemporary radio stations on February 7, 2012. It was later postponed a week to February 14, 2012, with a release to contemporary hit radio scheduled for the same date. However, Minaj announced that "Starships" would instead be released as the lead single.

On May 24, 2012, a poll was posted on Minaj's website, asking fans to help select the next singles, the poll is divided into three categories, the third category asks to choose the second worldwide pop single, the choices were: "Pound the Alarm", "Whip It", and "Va Va Voom". "Va Va Voom" had the most votes and won the poll. "Whip It" came in second place and "Pound The Alarm" came in third. However, after several radio stations in the UK, France, and Australia started heavily playing "Pound the Alarm", Minaj announced on June 6, 2012, that "Pound The Alarm" has been chosen instead. "Va Va Voom" was eventually solicited to contemporary hit radio in the United States on October 23, 2012.

Composition
Musically, "Va Va Voom" was described as "a sultry, electro-pop thumper" by Digital Spy. Lyrically, the song talks about "seduction finds Minaj playing the temptress atop some delicious dub-lite pulsations." It contains the lyrics "I know that he got a wife at home, but I need just one night alone." The verses of the song are rapped, while the bridge and chorus are sung.  "Va Va Voom" is set in common time with a tempo of 127 beats per minute.  Written in the key of C minor, it follows the chord progression Cm–E–B–A; Minaj's voice spans from A3 to B4.

Reception
"Va Va Voom" received acclaim from music critics. According to MTV Kara Klenk, "Va Va Voom" remains a "stand out track" on the album, along with "Beautiful Sinner," "Come on a Cone" and "Beez in the Trap." Sarah Crafford of The Sun Chronicle recommended the song to listeners who favored Minaj's Pop tracks, complimenting the song as a "catchy, sing-along and soon-to-be hit!." Comparing the song to that of "Super Bass,"  Alexander Miller of Quinnipiac University's Quad News stated that "Va Va Voom" could find itself as the hit bonus single of the album. Bradley Stern from MuuMuse was very positive saying the song was "insanely infectious" and compared the song to Britney Spears' song "Seal It With a Kiss". He also said "Throw in a very 'You da One'-esque breakdown (again, Dr. Luke), and you’ve got an unbelievably sickening (in the good way!) pop tune."

David Jeffries from Allmusic chose "Va Va Voom" as a standout track on the album. He compared the song to "some Black Eyed Peas-styled flash." Sal Cinquemani from Slant Magazine described the song as "the most obvious successor to Minaj's crossover hit [Super Bass.] David Asante of the Urban entertainment website That Grape Juice gave it a positive review and christened the song "SuperBass 2.0"."

Chart performance
Following the album's release, "Va Va Voom" sold 46,000 downloads, prompting it to debut at number seventy-nine on the Billboard Hot 100, eventually peaking at number twenty-two. It also debuted on the Canadian Hot 100 at number seventy-four. The song also garnered success across American Billboard charts, charting at number fifty on the Hot Digital Songs chart, 45 on the Hot Canadian Digital Songs chart, fifteen on the Rap Digital Songs, and twenty-one on the Pop Digital Songs. As of December 2014, "Va Va Voom" has sold 1.1 million copies in the United States.

The song debuted at thirty-six on the Australian Singles Chart, where it eventually peaked. It stayed there for two non-consecutive weeks, and stayed in the charts for seven weeks altogether. The song then charted at twenty-nine on the New Zealand Singles Chart and peaked at number twenty, continuing her top twenty peaking success. It stayed in for only eight weeks. The song peaked at six and one on the Belgium Singles Chart (Flanders and Wallonia), respectively and number 34 on the German Singles Chart.

In the UK Singles Chart, the song debuted at number 43, before climbing to number 20 a week later where it stayed there for two consecutive weeks. It spent a total of eight weeks in the top 40. The song debuted at number 37 in the Scottish Singles Chart, before climbing to 20 a week later, spending a total of eight weeks in the top 40. In the Irish Singles Chart, "Va Va Voom" debuted at number 31, before going on to peak at number 13 in its fifth week in the top 40. The song spent nine consecutive weeks in the top 40.

Music video

Background
The music video was filmed on December 21, 2011, in Los Angeles and was directed by Hype Williams. Even though during filming Minaj tweeted: "The look were about to shoot, your gonna Spazz", she later expressed her disliking of the end product, but eventually stated that it will be
released as a result of the song becoming a single. The music video premiered on October 26, 2012 on E! News.

Synopsis

The video begins with a rising sunset set in a fairytale like setting set in the wilderness. Two unicorns appear running across water, a reference to the movie Legend, before Minaj appears in a costume with a male companion (rumored to be Robin Hood) behind her, and special effects are displayed throughout the video. Minaj and the boy, dressed in a nobleman's attire continue to be flirtatious towards one another throughout the video, and he tries to woo Minaj, but she continues to play hard to get. The unicorns appear once more before Minaj is shown in another bizarre costume accompanied by a blonde wig. Then Minaj appears to be channeling the fairy tale princesses Sleeping Beauty and Snow White, while cooking, a knight appears before Minaj and intimidates her with his sword. She then appears to be lying inside of a glass showcase (possibly a glass "coffin", as follows the story of Snow White). In the end, Nicki pulls a surprising twist by appearing as the evil Queen and seducing the male companion when he arrives to save the "Snow White (Nicki)" from the glass showcase.

Reception
Gina Serpe from E! News gave the video a positive review, stating: "It's safe to say this video has something for everyone. Starting with Nicki herself looking damn good".

Live performances
Minaj performed "Va Va Voom" live for the first time on television on January 25, 2013 on Jimmy Kimmel Live!.

Charts

Weekly charts

Year-end charts

Certifications

Radio history

References

2012 singles
2012 songs
Nicki Minaj songs
Cash Money Records singles
Songs written by Nicki Minaj
Songs written by Dr. Luke
Songs written by Max Martin
Song recordings produced by Cirkut (record producer)
Song recordings produced by Dr. Luke
Music videos directed by Hype Williams
Songs written by Kool Kojak
Song recordings produced by Kool Kojak